"I Miss You" is a song by American rapper DMX, released as the third and final single from his fourth album The Great Depression (2001).. It features R&B singer Faith Evans.

Song Information

Meaning
This song is dedicated to DMX's grandmother, Mary Ella Holloway. Faith Evans sings a verse which recites Amazing Grace. The verse from Faith Evans is sung to add to the mood of the song. It is almost to imply that DMX was lost, but found his way in life after realising his potential.

Production
The song is considered one of DMX's most popular ones, however it is not present on his The Definition of X: The Pick of The Litter greatest hits compilation.

Samples
The song samples This Masquerade by George Benson.

Chart positions

References

2001 singles
DMX (rapper) songs
Music videos directed by Chris Robinson (director)
Faith Evans songs
Commemoration songs
2001 songs
Def Jam Recordings singles
Songs written by DMX (rapper)